Jack McElroy may refer to:

Jack McElroy, editor of Knoxville News Sentinel
Jack McElroy (footballer) (1913–1958), Australian rules footballer
Jack McElroy, a character in Sarah Jane Smith: Ghost Town

See also
John McElroy (disambiguation)